Daniel Biedermann (born 24 March 1993 in Klagenfurt) is an Austrian former professional racing cyclist.

Major results

2011
 1st Stage 4 Trofeo Karlsberg
 3rd Road race, National Junior Road Championships
2014
 2nd Poreč Trophy
 7th Trofej Umag
2015
 5th GP Laguna
 7th GP Izola
 9th GP Adria Mobil

References

External links

1993 births
Living people
Austrian male cyclists
Sportspeople from Klagenfurt